The 2021 Israeli Basketball National League Cup will be the 1st edition of the Israeli Basketball National League Cup, organized by the Israel Basketball Association.

On 10 May 2021, the Israel Basketball Association announced a change in the State Cup tournament format. only the first 8 teams at the end of the first rotation of the Israeli Basketball Premier League will compete in the State Cup and not all the teams participate in the Premier League and the Israeli Basketball National League.

On 11 August, 2021, the Israel Basketball Association held the draw for the tournament. The tournament format consists of one-game elimination match.

bracket

Round of 16
The round of 16 took place on 22-24 October, 2021. Ironi Kiryat Ata automatically advanced to the quarterfinals.

Quarterfinals

Semifinals

Final

References

Israeli Basketball National League Cup
Cup